Lischkeia alwinae is a species of deep-water sea snail, a marine gastropod mollusk in the family Eucyclidae.

Description
The size of the shell varies between 35 mm and 50 mm.

Distribution
This marine species occurs off Japan and in the China Sea.

References

 Poppe G.T., Tagaro S.P. & Dekker H. (2006) The Seguenziidae, Chilodontidae, Trochidae, Calliostomatidae and Solariellidae of the Philippine Islands. Visaya Supplement 2: 1–228, page(s): 56

External links
 

alwinae
Gastropods described in 1871